Maxime Le Flaguais (born 1982) is a Canadian actor, best known for his leading television role as Alexis Labranche in the 2016-21 drama series Les Pays d'en haut and his performance in the 2022 film Rodeo (Rodéo).

The son of actors Michel Côté and Véronique Le Flaguais, he had a number of early acting roles as Maxime Côté before opting in 2010 to use his mother's surname professionally, in a bid to establish his career on his own without the baggage of being judged against his father's status as one of Quebec's most famous actors. His first role credited as Maxime Le Flaguais was in the film Piché: The Landing of a Man (Piché, entre ciel et terre) as the young Robert Piché, with his father playing Piché as an adult.

He received a Canadian Screen Award nomination for Best Lead Performance in a Film at the 11th Canadian Screen Awards in 2023, for his performance in Rodeo.

He has also been an occasional songwriting collaborator with singer-songwriter Beyries, including on the songs "J'aurai cent ans" and "Nous sommes". They received a SOCAN Songwriting Prize nomination in 2017 for "J'aurai cent ans", and Le Flaguais codirected the music video for "Nous sommes".

In 2022 he directed his first narrative short film, Ourobouros.

Personal life
He is in a relationship with actress Caroline Dhavernas. Their first daughter, Françoise, was born in 2018.

Filmography

Film

Television

References

External links

1982 births
Living people
Canadian male film actors
Canadian male stage actors
Canadian male television actors
Canadian male voice actors
French Quebecers
Male actors from Quebec
Film directors from Quebec
21st-century Canadian male actors